{{Infobox television
| image                = Gry Forssell By Daniel Åhs Karlsson.jpg
| caption              = Show host Gry Forssell
| alt_name             = Summercross (English)'
| genre                =
| creator              = 
| based_on             = 
| developer            = 
| writer               = 
| director             = 
| creative_director    = 
| presenter            = 
| starring             = Gry Forssell
| judges               = 
| voices               = 
| narrated             = 
| theme_music_composer = 
| opentheme            = 
| endtheme             = 
| composer             = 
| country              = Sweden
| language             = 
| num_seasons          = 
| num_episodes         = 
| list_episodes        = 
| executive_producer   = 
| producer             = 
| editor               = 
| location             = 
| cinematography       = 
| camera               = 
| runtime              = 
| company              = 
| distributor          = 
| channel              = SVT1 (2005)TV4 (2006–2019)
| picture_format       = 
| audio_format         = 
| first_aired          = 
| last_aired           = 
| preceded_by          = 
| followed_by          = 
| related              =  
}}Sommarkrysset ("The Summer Cross") is a Swedish television program that is broadcast live from the Gröna Lund amusement park in Stockholm during the summer. It was first shown on 3 June 2005.

The TV show became famous for their early bookings of music artists such as Lady Gaga, Dua Lipa, Rita Ora, Jason Mraz, Ava Max who later went on to gain global success.

The program consists of live performances by famous artists in front of a live audience while viewers can call in and win a certain amount of money. To have the chance to win this money, the viewer first has to figure out a word which is derived by entering the answers to questions (one letter in each box) on a piece of graph paper with 5x5 squares like a crossword.

The program was created by Peter Settman's Baluba Productions and is produced Settman's Baluba Television.

The Lotto draw is usually broadcast live with Ulrica Bengtsson as a presenter, although others have presented the draw at times. Annika Duckmark has also been a regular presenter.

 Guests and artists 
Listed below are the artists who appeared in the program over the years.

 2005 
Host: Peter Settman

 3 June 2005: Lill Lindfors, Lisa Nilsson, Helena Paparizou, Velvet feat. Markoolio
 10 June 2005: Electric Banana Band, Jimmy Jansson, Nordman, Sofia Karlsson, Amy Diamond
 17 June 2005: Bonnie Tyler (Wales), Jill Johnson, Martin Stenmarck, Elin Lanto, Thomas Di Leva
 25 June 2005: Shirley Clamp, Grymlings, Cajsa-Stina Åkerström, Cameron Cartio, Kayo
 1 July 2005: Svante Thuresson, Nanne Grönvall, Sanne Salomonsen (Denmark), Bo Sundström, Rigo Pencheff (Swedish singer) & Pauline Kamusewu.

 2006 
Host: Gry Forssell

 8 July 2006: LaGaylia Frazier, Basshunter, Ola Svensson, Robert Wells, Markoolio.
 15 July 2006: Linda Bengtzing, Anna Book, Arvingarna.
 22 July 2006: Magnus Carlsson, BWO, Daniel Lindström, Dogge Doggelito & El Primo.
 29 July 2006: The Poodles & Tess Merkel, Shirley Clamp, Sebastian Karlsson, Roger Pontare.
 5 August 2006: Patrik Isaksson, Ana Johnsson, Veronica Maggio, Jonas Gardell.
 12 August 2006: Anna Sahlene, Martin Stenmarck, Backyard Babies, Immanuel Gospel.
 19 August 2006: Pernilla Wahlgren, Marit Bergman, Marie Serneholt, Elias feat. Frans, Amy Diamond.
 26 August 2006: Lisa Miskovsky, Mando Diao, Mange Schmidt, Bo Kaspers Orkester, Agnes Carlsson, Thomas Di Leva, Brolle Jr.

Returning guests during the season: Markoolio.

 2007 
Host: Gry Forssell, Rickard Olsson

 26 May 2007: Style, Sonja Aldén, Salem Al Fakir, Danny Saucedo, Markoolio & Dea Norberg.
 2 June 2007: Sahara Hotnights, Andreas Johnson, The Attic & Therese Grankvist, Arvingarna, Zillah & Totte.
 9 June 2007: Dr Alban, Shout Out Louds, Frida Muranius, Östen med resten, Emilia Rydberg, Immanuel Gospel.
 16 June 2007: Titiyo & Svante Thuresson, E-type, Linda Sundblad, Jessica Andersson, Weeping Willows.
 30 June 2007: Avril Lavigne (Canada), Fibes! Oh Fibes!, Charlotte Perrelli, Mikael Rickfors & Sara Löfgren, Jimmy Jansson.
 7 July 2007: Mange Schmidt, Petter, Ola Svensson, Peter Lundblad, Magnus Carlsson, Rongedal.
 14 July 2007: Per Gessle, Maia Hirasawa, Erik Segerstedt, Kristoffer Jonzon & Mikael Wiehe, Faith SFX (England).
 21 July 2007: Thorsten Flinck, Perssons Pack, Sarah Dawn Finer, Pernilla Andersson, Million Stylez.
 28 July 2007: Peter Stormare & The Poodles, Kikki Danielsson, Mimmi Sandén, Caroline af Ugglas, Lasse Lindh.
 4 August 2007: Tomas Andersson Wij, Kishti Tomita, Herreys, Danny Saucedo & Therese Grankvist, Jenny Silver, 6 AM feat. Cissi Ramsby.
 11 August 2007: Måns Zelmerlöw, BWO, Melody Club, Carl-Johan Vallgren, KOOP feat. Ane Brun (Norway), Anna Sahlene.
 18 August 2007: Howard Jones (England), Martin Stenmarck, Lill-Babs, Kenneth & the Knutters, Hanoi Rocks (Finland), Denise Lopez & Pras (USA).
 25 August 2007: Andreas Kleerup feat. Robyn, Moneybrother, Peter Jöback, Abalone Dots, Angel, The Diamond Dogs, Europe.

Returning guests during the season: Kicken from The Poodles, Tobbe Trollkarl and comedian Per Andersson (actor).

 2008 
Host: Gry Forssell

 17 May 2008: Jason Mraz (USA), Noice, Ola Svensson, Frida Muranius, Niklas Strömstedt.
 24 May 2008: Sara Bareilles (USA), M.A. Numminen, Linda Bengtzing, Lasse Lindh & Timo Räisänen, Millas Mirakel.
 31 May 2008: Ron Sexsmith (Canada), Eric Gadd, Andreas Kleerup & Titiyo, Attack, Kick.
 28 June 2008: HammerFall, Robert Wells, Sonja Aldén, Marie Picasso, Arash with Velvet.
 5 July 2008: Amy Diamond, Patrik Isaksson, Trazan & Banarne, Mats Rådberg & Rankarna, September.
 12 July 2008: Rongedal, Hasse Andersson, Takida, Alcazar.
 19 July 2008: Hästpojken, Mange Schmidt with the Urban Angels dance group, Lars Vegas Trio, Dilba, Kikki Danielsson.
 26 July 2008: E.M.D., Rednex, Neverstore, Alphabeat (Denmark), Staffan Hellstrand, Zara Larsson.
 2 August 2008: Martha Wash (The Weather Girls) (USA), Brolle, Backyard Babies, Caracola, Göran Ringbom.
 9 August 2008: Moto Boy, Sanna Nielsen, The Poodles, Carl Einar Häckner, Veronica Maggio.
 16 August 2008: Black Jack, Sibel Redzep, Nordman, Nisse Hellberg, Agnes Carlsson.
 23 August 2008: Markus Krunegård, Amanda Jenssen, Sha-Boom, Nanne Grönvall, Niclas Wahlgren.
 30 August 2008: Lady GaGa (USA), Afasi & Filthy with Urban Angels, Christer Sjögren, Molly Sandén with Tensta Gospel, Markus Fagervall.
 9 September 2008: Charlotte Perrelli, Peter Stormare, Martin Stenmarck, Henrik Hjelt (Ladies Night), The Script (Republic of Ireland), Lillasyster, Ankie Bagger. (Spelades in den 6 September, sändes bandat den 9)
 13 September 2008: Tomas Di Leva, Bo Kaspers Orkester, Miss Li, Elin Lanto, Anna Sahlin (from the Footloose musical).

Returning guests during the season: Kicken & Noppe (played by Carl Adam Lewenhaupt), Bosse Rappne and Christian Hellberg.

 2009 
Host: David Hellenius, Carina Berg & Carolina Gynning, Tobbe Blom and Måns Zelmerlöw

 13 June 2009: Lasse Berghagen, Eros Ramazzotti (Italy), Rigo Pencheff (Swedish singer) & The Topaz Sound, Brolle with the "Buddy Holly" musical ensemble.
 20 June 2009: Xtra & King Fari Band (Michael Lindgren ur Grotesco-humorgänget), Miss Li, BWO, Melody Club, Patrik Isaksson.
 27 June 2009: Sven-Bertil Taube, Sahara Hotnights, Alice Svensson, Lasse Lindh, Jessica Andersson & Sara Löfgren.
 4 July 2009: Dead by April, Erik Hassle, Robert Wells, Thomas Di Leva, Erik Linder (Talang 2009).
 11 July 2009 Moneybrother, Johan Palm, Konditorns, Velvet, E.M.D.
 18 July 2009: Timbuktu, Theresa Andersson, Petter with Eye N'I, Shirley Clamp.
 25 July 2009: Pernilla Andersson, Måns Zelmerlöw, Roger Pontare, The Poodles, Niclas Wahlgren.
 1 August 2009: Salem Al Fakir, Rongedal, Magnus Carlsson, Yohanna (Iceland).
 8 August 2009: Perssons Pack, Star Pilots, Emilia Rydberg, Darin.
 15 August 2009: Scotts, Caroline af Ugglas, Kevin Borg, HEAT, Jaqee.
 29 August 2009: Markoolio & Benjamin Wahlgren, Tomas Ledin, Martin Stenmarck, Alcazar.
 5 September 2009: Europe, Fibes! Oh Fibes! & Kim Wilde (England), Ola Svensson, Thorsten Flinck, Peter Johansson & Nina Söderquist.

 2010 
Host: E.M.D., Måns Möller, Linda Bengtzing and Gry Forssell.

 15 May 2010: Eric Saade, Orup, Alexandra Burke (England), Linda Bengtzing & Velvet.
 22 May 2010: Timoteij, Amy Macdonald (Scotland), Eric Gadd, Joshua Radin (USA), Rebound (Swedish boyband) & Dj Sara Varga.
 29 May 2010: Dr Alban, E.M.D., Lazee & Apollo Drive, Linda Pritchard, Stephen Simmonds.
 5 June 2010: Robyn, Petter, Cookies 'N' Beans, Erik Grönwall, Play, Crossfire with Rigo Pencheff & Körslaget-kören The Rinkeby Sound.
 17 July 2010: Madcon (Norway), Fibes, Oh Fibes!, Crucified Barbara, Rasmus Seebach (Denmark) with Immanuel Gospel & Tensta Gospel Choir, Anne-Lie Rydé, Magnus Carlson (from Weeping Willows) with others.
 24 July 2010: Ola Joyce, Anna Bergendahl, Style, Le Kid, Sean Banan, Peter Jezewski.
 31 July 2010: Lena Meyer-Landrut (Germany), Martin Stenmarck, Shout Out Louds, Marie Serneholt & Sebastian Karlsson & Grease-ensemblen, Kato (Denmark), Peter Gustafsson (Bonde söker fru) & Ankie Bagger.
 7 August 2010: Oskar Linnros, Ola Svensson, Broken Door, Sanna Nielsen with Immanuel Gospel, Lovestoned with others.
 14 August 2010: Johnossi, Flo Rida (USA), Darin, Patrik Isaksson, Kikki Danielsson, Tensta Gospel Choir.
 21 August 2010: Pugh Rogefeldt, Brolle, Christina Chanée & Tomas n'evergreen (Denmark), Takida, Tove Styrke, Mohombi Moupondo, Simone Moreno with the Samba São Miguel percussionists with the Viva do Brasil dance group.
Returning guests during the season: David Druid

 2011 
Host: Gry Forssell. 9 July and 16 July deputies Agneta Sjödin as host.
 25 June: Eric Saade, Sahara Hotnights, Patrik Isaksson
 2 June: The Ark, Jessica Andersson, Magnus Carlsson, Loreen
 9 June: Brolle, Jedward (Republic of Ireland), Kikki Danielsson
 16 July: Christer Sjögren, Takida, Shirley Clamp
 23 July: September, The Moniker, Anne-Lie Rydé
 30 July: Eric Amarillo, Sanna Nielsen, Tommy Nilsson
 6 August : Martin Stenmarck, Swingfly, Caroline af Ugglas
 13 August : Carola, Danny Saucedo, The Poodles & Immanuel Gospel.
 20 August : Lena Philipsson, Jill Johnson, Rolandz with Robert Gustafsson, Ison & Fille feat. Julia Spada (from O'Spada) & Dj Taro.
Returning guests during the season: Rolandz with Robert Gustafsson.

 2012 
Host: Gry Forssell and Agneta Sjödin split up the season as hosts.
 30 June: Moa Lignell, Alina Devecerski, Haddaway (Germany), Andreas Lundstedt, Dr Bombay & La Cream.
 7 July: Ivi Adamou (Cyprus), Icona Pop, Tomas Andersson Wij, Anna Sahlene & Immanuel Gospel, Wallmans 20th anniversary ensemble.
 14 July: Ane Brun (Norway), Far East Movement (USA), Pernilla Wahlgren, Lilla Sällskapet, Timoteij.
 21 July: Danny Saucedo, Markoolio, Vulkano (tidigare Those Dancing Days), H.E.A.T.
 28 July: Molly Sandén, Brolle, Frispråkarn & Uno Svenningsson, Caligola, Stooshe (England).
 4 August: Tone Damli (Norway) & Eric Saade, Norlie & KKV,  & Eric Gadd, Louise Hoffsten, Diamond Dogs.
 11 August: Mikael Wiehe, Olly Murs (England), Amanda Fondell, Dead By April.
 18 August: Bo Kaspers Orkester, Fibes, Oh Fibes, Björn Ranelid & Sara Li, Isa.
 25 August: Miss Li, Sons of Midnight (Australia), David Lindgren, Darin, Tensta Gospel Choir with the dance groups P*Fect, Urban Angels, Micina, Grounded (Swidish dancegroup).
 1 September: Marina and the Diamonds (Wales), Agnes, Sarah Dawn Finer, Martin Stenmarck & Andreas Johnson (Ladies Night), Stiftelsen.

 2013 
Host: Gry Forssell
 22 June: Jason Derulo (USA), NONONO, Darin, Timoteij, Uno Svenningsson
 29 June: Margaret Berger (Norway), Eric Saade, Oscar Zia, Behrang Miri, Hovturnén (with Wille Crafoord, Dan Hylander, Marika Willstedt
 6 July: Robin Stjernberg, Zara Larsson, Loop Troop Rockers, Pugh Rogefeldt
 13 July: -
 20 July: Anton Ewald, Ansiktet, Ulrik Munther, Nanne Grönvall
 27 July: Loreen, The Brand New Heavies (England), Tommy Nilsson, The Wanted (England/Republic of Ireland), Janet Leon
 3 August: Miriam Bryant, Danny Saucedo, Hästpojken, Magnus Carlsson, Sylver Logan Sharp (former lead singer of CHIC (band) (USA).
 10 August: Alcazar, Norlie & KKV, Sean Banan, State of Drama
 17 August: Yohio, Jonas Gardell, The Fooo, Brolle, Amanda Fondell.
 24 August: Elliphant, Agnes, Caroline af Ugglas, Ola Svensson, Markoolio & Tobbe Trollkarl from the (Wizard of Oz musical)
 31 August: Hoffmaestro, Jasmine Kara, Medina, Lasse Holm, (Björn Kjellman & Pernilla Wahlgren a.o. (from the Priscilla musical)

 2014 
Host: Gry Forssell
 21 June: Doug Seegers (USA), Lisa Stansfield (England), Oscar Zia, Linda Bengtzing.
 28 June: Anders Wendin (aka Moneybrother, aka Pengabrorsan), Stefan Sundström, Albin featuring Kristin Amparo, Amanda Fondell, Jasmine Kara
 5 July: Ella Henderson (England), Vance Joy (Australia), Ebbot Lundberg (from The Soundtrack Of Our Lives), Charlotte Perrelli,
 12 July: Foxes (England), Ane Brun (Norway), Samir & Viktor, Thomas Stenström, Gladys del Pilar, Brolle & Andreas Johnson,
 19 July: Kim Cesarion, Basim (Denmark), Helena Paparizou, Yohio, Gabriel Forss med Du kan sjunga gospel-kören,
 26 July: Tove Lo, Nisse Hellberg, Martin Stenmarck, Anna Sahlene, Medina (Swedish artist).
 2 August: Anton Ewald featuring Medina (Denmark), Patrik Isaksson, Kevin Walker, Elisa Lindström, Linda Pritchard
 9 August: Teddybears, Miriam Bryant, Titiyo, Molly Sandén, Panetoz, Linus Svenning,
 16 August: Isac Elliot (Finland), Alina Devecerski, Alcazar, Electric Banana Band, Dynamite Cheerleading
 23 August: NONONO, Swedish House Mafia lead singer John Martin, Ace Wilder, Sean Banan, Move Your Feet (dancers from Let's Dance)

Returning guests during the season: Sean Banan

 2015 
Host: Gry Forssell
 20 June: Molly Sandén, Isa, Tommy Nilsson, Patrik Isaksson and Uno Svenningsson, JustD, and Erik Hassle.
 27 June: Mauro Scocco, Icona Pop, Chris Olsson (Fibes, Oh Fibes!), Ace Wilder and Moa Lignell.
 4 July: Måns Zelmerlöw, Love Antell, Hasse Andersson, Heavy Tiger and The Fooo Conspiracy.
 11 July: Molly Pettersson Hammar, Panetoz, Backyard Babies, Timoteij and De Vet Du.
 18 July: Eric Saade, Little Jinder, Kitok, Maxida Marak, Johan Holmstrom (aka "Snoppen & Snippan), Tony Irving a.o. from the Wild Thing - About Love show.
 25 July: Little Mix (England), Ola Salo, Zara Larsson, Tomas Brolin, Mariette, Kristin Amparo, Andreas Weise and Christer Sjögren.
 1 August: Medina, Samuel Ljungblahd with By Grace Gospel Choir, Brolle & Nanne Grönvall a.o.
 8 August: Sabina Ddumba, Samir & Viktor, Yohio & Ellen Bergstrom, Black Jack a.o.
 15 August: Loreen, Darin, Bo Kaspers Orkester, Elliphant, and Brynolf & Ljung a.o.

Returning guests during the season: Brynolf & Ljung

 2016 
Host: Gry Forssell

9 July: Linda Pira & Molly Sandén, Sabina Ddumba, Margaret (Poland), Owe Thörnqvist, Panetoz.

16 July: Näääk & Nimo med Kaliffa, Caroline af Ugglas, The Fooo Conspiracy, Jennifer Brown, Boris Renée.

23 July: Little Jinder, Movits!, Takida, Elisa Lindström, Samir & Viktor.

30 July: Malena Ernman, SaRaha, State of Sound, Jakob Karlberg, Amanda Winberg, Evelina Olsén.

6 August: John de Sohn med Albin Johnsen & Mattias Andreasson, Charlotte Perrelli & Brolle, Wiktoria, Mariette, Flying Illusion (Tyskland)

13 August: Dua Lipa (England), Doug Seegers (USA), Kristin Amparo & Combo De La Musica, Martin Stenmarck, Isa a.o.

20 August: Rebecca & Fiona, Shawn Hook (Canada), Måns Zelmerlöw, Alcazar, Joshua Radin (USA) a.o.

Returning guests during the season: Samir & Viktor, Bianca Wahlgren Ingrosso and Ellen Bergström.

 2017 
Host: Gry Forssell

10 June: Magnus Uggla, Nano, KSMB, Kamferdrops (Norway), Charlotte Perrelli

17 June: Marcus & Martinus (Norway), Rhys, Rebecca & Fiona with Dolores Haze, Niello feat. Robin Stjernberg, Martin Stenmarck

24 June: Margaret (Poland), Tjuvjakt, Tommy Nilsson, Tone Norum, Anton Ewald, The Music of Motown musical (feat. Gladys del Pilar, Jessica Folcker, Blossom Tainton)

8 July: Rita Ora (England), The Rasmus (Finland/USA), Eric Gadd, Mariette, Thomas Stenström

15 July: Starley (Australia), Jens Lekman, Linda Pira, Anton Hagman, Benjamin Ingrosso

22 July: Lilla Namo, Finess & Miss Li, Jon Henrik Fjällgren & Aninia, Elisa Lindström, Dolly Style

29 July: Ray BLK (England), Strandels, Peg Parnevik, Stiftelsen, Thomas Sekelius, Champions of Rock feat. Jenna Lee-James & Peter Johansson

19 August: Eric Saade, Icona Pop, Courtney Marie Andrews (USA), Molly Sandén, Nano, Mange Schmidt.

 2018 
Host: Gry Forssell

30 June: Rebecca & Fiona feat. , Moneybrother, Rolandz, Dotter, De Vet Du.

7 July:  Tomas Andersson Wij, Jessica Andersson, Rhys, Babblarna, Linda Pira & Dani M.

14 July: Anne-Marie (England), Theoz (Theo Haraldsson), Peg Parnevik (feat. Immanuel Gospel), Thomas Di Leva, Moncho, Isaac and The Soul Company

21 July: Sabina Ddumba, Tjuvjakt, Dolores Haze, Darin, Larz-Kristerz.

28 July: Eagle-Eye Cherry, Wiktoria, Jireel, John Lundvik, Sigrid Bernson.

4 August:Peter Jöback, Maxida Märak, Hardcore Superstar, Elias Abbas, Margaret (Poland).

11 August: Silvana Imam, Benjamin Ingrosso, Felix Sandman, Jonas Gardell (feat. Immanuel Gospel), Maia Hirasawa.

15 August: Lasse Stefanz, Petter, Lena Philipsson, Mendez, Mariette, Smith & Thell feat. Swedish Jam Factory (formerly known as Swedish Gun Factory)

Returning guests during the season:: Björn Ranelid.

 2019    
Host: Gry Forssell

8 June: Weeping Willows, Bonnie Tyler (Wales), Linae, Näääk & Denz, Jessica Andersson

15 June: Mahmood (Italy), Peter Jöback, Anna Bergendahl, Erik Lundin, Malou Prytz

22 June: Movits! & Tjuvjakt, Hanna Ferm, David Lindgren & Kristina Lindgren, Chris Kläfford

30 June: Miss Li & Petter, Tomas Andersson Wij, Estraden, Kaliffa, Måns Zelmerlöw & Dotter, Takida

6 July: Jakob Hellman, Kitok, Silvana Imam, Charlotte Perrelli, Nano, Leia

13 July: Pontus & Amerikanerna, Anis Don Demina feat. Mapei, Tamta (Greece), Gutarra, Jon Henrik Fjällgren

20 July: Felix Sandman, Benjamin Ingrosso, Mohombi, Backyard Babies, Pernilla Andersson, Sigrid Bernson

27 July: Sabina Ddumba, Wiktoria, Keiino (Norway), Victor Crone, Rigmor Gustafsson, Hedda Hatar

3 August: Lena Philipsson, Lina Hedlund, Mamma Mia The Party, Doug Seegers (USA), Paul Rey, Eric Saade

10 August: Ava Max (USA), Sven-Ingvars, Theoz, 

 2020 
The 2020 season is cancelled due to the COVID-19 pandemic. 

(source: http://www.tv4.se/sommarkrysset/artiklar/v%C3%A4rldsartister-till-gry-forssell-i-sommarkrysset-593681fefca38f83ec0006f9  )

 2021 
The 2021 season is cancelled due to the COVID-19 pandemic.

 Vinterkrysset (Wintercross) Vinterkrysset is a wintertime spin-off variation on Sommarkrysset, the program has been broadcast in two rounds on TV4. The first time the program was broadcast was in 2006 in Tyrol, Gröna Lund.

 Guests and artists on Vinterkrysset 

 2006 
Host: Gry Forssell
 9 December 2006: Moneybrother duet with Jerry Williams, Orup, Darin, The Poodles, Amy Diamond

 2009–10 
Host: Gry Forssell
 29 December 2009: Marie Serneholt duet with Sebastian Karlsson, Linda Sundblad, Darin.
 31 December 2009: Lili & Susie, Amy Diamond, Sara Löfgren, Style.
 3 January 2010: Petter, Ison & Fille, Mogge Sseruwagi and DJ Sleepy, Pernilla Andersson, Nordman.
 6 January 2010: Erik Grönwall, Chris Norman (Smokie) (England), Martin Stenmarck, Niklas Strömstedt.
Returning guests during the season: Carolina Gynning and comedian Per Andersson act like reporters.

 Pictures 

 See also 
 Allsång på Skansen''

References

External links 
 
 
 

2000s Swedish television series
2005 Swedish television series debuts
2010s Swedish television series
Gröna Lund
Swedish music television series
TV4 (Sweden) original programming